Tritia grana is a species of sea snail, a marine gastropod mollusk in the family Nassariidae, the Nassa mud snails or dog whelks.

Spelling
The specific name was originally introduced in the binomen Buccinum grana, translated in French as "buccin graine". This has been emended to granum by Kiener (1834: 22) and most subsequent authors, presumably considering that the correct Latin word for "graine" ("seed") is granum. Therefore, the spelling granum must be conserved in application of ICZN art. 33.2.3.1. "when an unjustified emendation is in prevailing usage and is attributed to the original author and date it is deemed to be a justified emendation".

Description
The shell size varies between 10 mm and 14 mm

The small shell is ovate, pretty thick, reddish, smooth and shining. It is surrounded with interrupted, small, brown lines, more approximate towards the middle of the lowest whorl, and of a deeper color at the base. The spire is elongated, pointed. It is composed of seven slightly convex whorls, surrounded at their upper part by a white band, sprinkled with distant, brown points or spots. The aperture is white. The internal edge of the outer lip is crenulated, the external part forming a smooth, thick callus, of a dull white, which is continued upon the base of the shell even to the columella, which is arcuated and folded at its base.

Distribution
This species occurs in the Mediterranean Sea and in the Atlantic Ocean off Senegal.

References

 Cernohorsky W. O. (1984). Systematics of the family Nassariidae (Mollusca: Gastropoda). Bulletin of the Auckland Institute and Museum 14: 1–356
 Gofas, S.; Le Renard, J.; Bouchet, P. (2001). Mollusca, in: Costello, M.J. et al. (Ed.) (2001). European register of marine species: a check-list of the marine species in Europe and a bibliography of guides to their identification. Collection Patrimoines Naturels, 50: pp. 180–213

External links
 
 Lamarck, (J.-B. M.) de. (1822). Histoire naturelle des animaux sans vertèbres. Tome septième. Paris: published by the Author, 711 pp
 Risso, A. (1826-1827). Histoire naturelle des principales productions de l'Europe Méridionale et particulièrement de celles des environs de Nice et des Alpes Maritimes. Paris, F.G. Levrault. 3(XVI): 1-480, 14 pls.
 Pallary, P. (1900). Coquilles marines du littoral du département d'Oran. Journal de Conchyliologie. 48(3): 211-422.
 Locard, A. (1886). Prodrome de malacologie française. Catalogue général des mollusques vivants de France. Mollusques marins. Lyon: H. Georg & Paris: Baillière. x + 778 pp
 Pallary, P. (1920). Exploration scientifique du Maroc organisée par la Société de Géographie de Paris et continuée par la Société des Sciences Naturelles du Maroc. Deuxième fascicule. Malacologie. i>Larose, Rabat et Paris pp. 108. 1(1)
 Galindo, L. A.; Puillandre, N.; Utge, J.; Lozouet, P.; Bouchet, P. (2016). The phylogeny and systematics of the Nassariidae revisited (Gastropoda, Buccinoidea). Molecular Phylogenetics and Evolution. 99: 337-353.

grana
Gastropods described in 1822